Prem Parkash (born 7 April 1932) is a writer from Punjab, India. He "is one of the major short story writers in post-1947 East Punjabi literature." He is also known as Prem Parkash Khannvi.

Early life and career
Parkash's native village is Bdeenpur which once belonged to the Nabha dynasty. He took his basic education from Bhadson village and then went to Khanna for matriculation.. He did J.B.T. from Christian Basic Training School (Kharar). He completed his graduation in 1963–64 and then post-graduation from Punjab University, Chandigarh in Urdu.

Parkash began his career as a farmer in Badgujjran near Amloh. Parkash then taught in a primary school from 1953 up to 1962 then worked as an editor of an Urdu newspaper in Jalandhar from 1964 up to 1969 and then as a sub-editor for Hind Samachar from 1969 to 1990. In 1990, he started a literary magazine Lakeer in collaboration with Surjit Haans.

Works
Some of his works include:

Stories
 ਕੱਚ-ਕੜੇ (1966) - Kacche Ghadhe
 ਨਮਾਜ਼ੀ (1971) - Namazi
 ਮੁਕਤੀ (1980) - Mukti
 ਸ਼੍ਵੇਤਾਮਬਰ ਨੇ ਕਿਹਾ ਸੀ (1983) - Shetambar ne keha si
 ਕੁਝ ਅਣਕਿਹਾ ਵੀ (1990) (Awarded the Sahitya Akademi Award) - Kuch Ankeha vi
 ਰੰਗਮੰਚ ਤੇ ਭਿਕਸ਼ੂ (1995) - Rangmunch te Bhikshu
 ਸੁਣਦੈਂ ਖ਼ਲੀਫ਼ਾ (2001) - Sundaen Khalifa
 ਕਥਾ ਅਨੰਤ (all stories in a single volume) (1995) - Katha Anant
 Deadline and Other stories (2001)

Stories adapted for films
 ਬੰਗਲਾ - Bangla
 ਮਾੜਾ ਬੰਦਾ - Mada Banda
 ਡਾਕਟਰ ਸ਼ਕੁੰਤਲਾ - Doctor Shakuntala
 ਗੋਈ - Gori
 ਨਿਰਵਾਣ - Nirvaan

Awards Won
 Punjabi Sahit Academy 1982
 Bhai Veer Singh Vartak Puraskar 1986
 Sahitya Academi (National) 1992
 Punjabi Sahit Academy, Delhi 1994
 Punjabi Sahit Academy, Ludhiana 1996
 Katha Samman, Katha Sansthan, Delhi 1996-97
 Shiromani Sahitkar, Bhasha Vibhag, Punjab 2002
 Punjabi Sahit Rattan, Bhasha Vibhag, Punjab 2011
 Punjab Gaurav, Punjab Kala Parishad 2019
 Sahitya Akademi Translation Prize

Autobiography
ਬੰਦੇ ਅੰਦਰ ਬੰਦੇ (1993) - Bande Andar Bande
ਆਤਮ ਮਾਯਾ (2005) - Atam Maya
ਮੇਰੀ ਉਰਦੂ ਅਖਬਾਰ ਨਵੀਸੀ (2007) - Meri Urdu Akhbar Navisi
ਦੇਖ ਬੰਦੇ ਦੇ ਭੇਖ (2013) - Dekh Bande de Bhekh

References

Indian male short story writers
Indian storytellers
1932 births
Living people
20th-century Indian short story writers
Writers from Punjab, India
20th-century Indian male writers
Recipients of the Sahitya Akademi Prize for Translation
Recipients of the Sahitya Akademi Award in Punjabi